Giliogiris is a village in Rietavas municipality, in Telšiai County, in western Lithuania. According to the 2011 census, the village has a population of 154 people.

Notable people 
 Jonas Pleškys (1935-1993), Soviet Navy submarine tender captain.
 Eugenija Pleškytė (1938-2012), Lithuanian actress

References

Rietavas Municipality
Villages in Telšiai County